Live is a live CD/DVD set from City and Colour, side project of Dallas Green, one of the vocalists and guitarists of the band Alexisonfire. It was released on March 6, 2007. A limited edition has also been released at the same time. It included a USB key with footage from MMVA and Much on Demand performances.

Track list

DVD listing
 Forgive Me
 Comin' Home
 Like Knives
 Sam Malone
 Day Old Hate
 Confessions
 Save Your Scissors
 Casey's Song
 Sometimes (I Wish)
 Happiness by the Kilowatt

Bonus material
 Forgive Me (Malkin Bowl, Vancouver)
 Hello, I'm in Delaware (Malkin Bowl, Vancouver)
 Comin' Home (Malkin Bowl, Vancouver)
 Wastin' Time (Halifax Club with Ron Sexsmith)

References

City and Colour video albums
2007 live albums
2007 video albums
Live video albums